Adiponitrile is an organic compound with the chemical formula (CH2)4(CN)2. This viscous, colourless dinitrile is an important precursor to the polymer nylon 66. In 2005, about one million tonnes of adiponitrile were produced.

Production

Early methods
Because of the industrial value of adiponitrile, many methods have been developed for its synthesis. Early industrial methods started from furfural and later by the chlorination of butadiene to give 1,4-dichloro-2-butene, which with sodium cyanide, converts to 3-hexenedinitrile, which in turn can be hydrogenated to adiponitrile:
ClCH2CH=CHCH2Cl  +  2 NaCN  →  NCCH2CH=CHCH2CN  +  2 NaCl
NCCH2CH=CHCH2CN  +  H2  →  NC(CH2)4CN
Adiponitrile has also been produced from adipic acid, by dehydration of the diamide, but this is rarely employed.

Modern methods
After patent application in 2004, the majority of adiponitrile is prepared by the nickel-catalysed hydrocyanation of butadiene, as discovered at DuPont, pioneered by William C. Drinkard. The net reaction is:
CH2=CHCH=CH2 + 2 HCN → NC(CH2)4CN

The process involves several stages, the first of which involves monohydrocyanation (the addition of one molecule of HCN), affording isomers of pentenenitriles as well as 2- and 3-methylbutanenitriles. These unsaturated nitriles are subsequently isomerized to the 3-and 4-pentenenitriles. In the final stage, these pentenenitriles are subjected to a second hydrocyanation, in an anti-Markovnikov sense, to produce adiponitrile.

3-pentenenitrile, formed in the first hydrocyanation, can undergo alkene metathesis to give dicyanobutenes, which are readily hydrogenated as described above. A useful byproduct of the production of adiponitrile is 2-methylglutaronitrile.

The other major industrial method involves hydrodimerization, starting from acrylonitrile:
2 CH2=CHCN  +  2 e−  +  2 H+   →  NCCH2CH2CH2CH2CN

The electrolytic coupling of acrylonitrile was discovered at Monsanto Company.

Applications
Almost all adiponitrile is hydrogenated to hexane-1,6-diamine for the production of nylon:
NC(CH2)4CN  +  4 H2   →    H2N(CH2)6NH2
Like other nitriles, adiponitrile is susceptible to hydrolysis; however, the resulting adipic acid is less expensively prepared via other routes.

Production
In 2018, there existed approximately 1.5 million metric tons of capacity. The main producers of adiponitrile were:

Ascend Performance Materials: Decatur, Alabama (US); 400 metric kilotons per year (kt/y), expanded to 580 kt/y by 2022
Invista: Victoria, Texas and Orange, Texas, (US)
Invista and BASF "Butachimie ADN plant": Chalampé (France); production to be increased from 100 kt/y in 2020 to 600 kt/y
Asahi Kasei (Japan)

BASF closed the 128 kt/y ADN plant at Seal Sands in 2009.

In 2015, the Shandong Runxing New Material 100 kt/y plant suffered an explosion and was not reopened. In 2022, Invista plans to open a 300–400 kt/y plant in Shanghai.

Safety
The  (median lethal dose) of adiponitrile is 300 mg/kg for oral ingestion by rats.

In 1990, ACGIH adopted a time-weighted average Threshold Limit Value of 2ppm for work-related skin exposure.

The NIOSH recommended skin exposure limit for a work-related time weighted average concentration is 4ppm (18 mg/m3).

Adiponitrile is classified as an extremely hazardous substance in the United States as defined in Section 302 of the U.S. Emergency Planning and Community Right-to-Know Act (42 U.S.C. 11002), and is subject to strict reporting requirements by facilities which produce, store, or use it in significant quantities.

References

External links

www.chemicalland.com
www.nist.gov

Alkanedinitriles